Jeanette Rose Dunning (born 4 March 1957) is a New Zealand former cricketer who played as an all-rounder, batting right-handed and bowling right-arm off break. She appeared in 6 Test matches and 22 One Day Internationals for New Zealand between 1984 and 1988. She played domestic cricket for Auckland and North Shore.

References

External links

1957 births
Living people
Cricketers from Auckland
New Zealand women cricketers
New Zealand women Test cricketers
New Zealand women One Day International cricketers
Auckland Hearts cricketers
North Shore women cricketers